Kasper Ansgarius "Ansgar" Almquist (4 February 1889 – 15 June 1973) was a Swedish sculptor, primarily of freestanding figural bronzes.

Early life and education
Born in Säby parish, now part of Tranås Municipality, to sales clerk Gustav Almquist and Augusta Åhman, Almquist was raised in the village of Åsen went to work for a furniture company when he was 14. In 1908 he began studying at the KTH Royal Institute of Technology in Stockholm; he continued in 1909 under the painter Carl Wilhelmson at Valand Academy in Gothenburg, and starting in 1910 in Paris, at the Académie Colarossi under Jean Antoine Injalbert and the École des Beaux-Arts. After the First World War, he returned to Europe in the 1920s on study tours in England, France, Germany and Italy.

Career
Almquist established his studio in Stockholm. He exhibited frequently with the Swedish Association of Artists, and individually in Tranås in 1930 and in Norrköping in 1944. From 1931 to 1938 he taught at the Högre konstindustriella skolan in Stockholm and from 1945 at its successor, Konstfack.

His life-size bronze Gångaren (Race Walker) was part of the sculpture event in the art competition at the 1936 Summer Olympics.

Personal life and death
Almquist married Sigrid Maria Löfgren in 1916.

Collections

Selected works
 Gångaren (Race Walker, 1936), Tidaholm
 Carl Linnaeus (1938), Lund
 Damen i dammen (1959), Skara

 Mälarstäderna, Stockholm City Hall
 Fiskarflickan, Stockholm County Museum

References

External links
 

1889 births
1973 deaths
20th-century Swedish sculptors
20th-century Swedish male artists
Swedish male sculptors
Olympic competitors in art competitions
People from Tranås Municipality